Jean Rey may refer to:

Jean Rey (physician) (c. 1583–c. 1645), French physician and chemist
Jean Rey (politician) (1902–1983), Belgian Liberal politician
Jean Rey (cyclist) (1925–1950), French cyclist

See also
Jean Ray (disambiguation)